Kanpur Development Authority is the urban development agency of Kanpur metropolitan area, Uttar Pradesh, India. As the industries in Kanpur grew faster the village population also attracted towards the city. In present time the population of Kanpur city has crossed 30 lakhs(3 million). Due to the rate of growth in population, it was decided that a development authority should be constituted. Region administered by Kanpur Development Authority and Unnao-Shuklaganj Development Authority comes under Kanpur Metropolitan Area. There has been a proposal to merge both the authorities to form Kanpur Metropolitan Area Development Authority (KMADA).

In accordance to the Uttar Pradesh Urban Development Act, 1973 Kanpur Development Authority was constituted.

Organization 
The development of infrastructure in Kanpur is overseen by Kanpur Development Authority (KDA), which comes under the Housing Department of Uttar Pradesh government. The Divisional Commissioner of Kanpur acts as the ex-officio Chairman of KDA, whereas a Vice Chairman, a government-appointed IAS officer, looks after the daily matters of the authority. The current Divisional Commissioner and ex-officio Chairman is Pradeep Kumar Mohanty, whereas the current Vice-Chairman of Kanpur Development Authority is Arvind Singh.

Board

Master Plan

Kanpur Development Authority has Master plans (2021) for Kanpur, Akbarpur and Bithoor.

Proposed Master Plan for Kanpur City, Year 2021 by KDA

Residential     :  41.67%
Industrial     :  5.64%
Amenities     :  3.7%
Transport & communication  :  9.98%
Recreational     :  9.56%
Public Services    :  3.81%
Trade     :  2.61%
Other uses     :  9.27%

See also

References

External links
 KDA Website

Government of Kanpur
Government agencies established in 1955
State urban development authorities of India
State agencies of Uttar Pradesh
1955 establishments in Uttar Pradesh
Organisations based in Kanpur
